Rádio Barlavento was a radio station in Cape Verde which broadcast in the Portuguese language from 1955 until 1974. It was a shortwave (CR4AC) station broadcasting on 3930 kHz. From 1947 until 1955 it was called Rádio Clube do Mindelo. In 1974 it was seized by members of the Partido Africano da Independência de Guiné-Bissau e Cabo Verde - PAIGC, who sought to "get the station out of hands of those who aligned with colonial power." After this the station became Radio Voz de Sao Vicente (lit. Voice of São Vicente). The station served the entire Barlavento island group including Santo Antão, São Vicente, São Nicolau, Sal and Boa Vista. The station was located in a building near downtown Mindelo, which is now the Centro Nacional de Artesanato e Design, and broadcast Cape Verdean traditional music, local programs, and Portuguese and some international programming.  Rádio Voz de São Vicente later became an affiliate of RCV, Mindelo's own station would have another separate one and would be named Ràdio Nova.

In the early years, Sérgio Frusoni was an announcer at the station, producing the program Mosaico Mindelense in Cape Verdean creole.  Also João Cleofas Martins, better known as Djunga Fotografo was also an announcer who appeared at the station.  Guitarist Gregorio Gonçalves allowed Cesária Évora to sings at the station who was also first recorded on magnetic tape, a plaque is located on the southwest corner of the exterior or the building reading the existence of the station and of Cesária Évora.

See also
List of companies in Cape Verde

References

Radio stations in Cape Verde
Defunct radio stations
Radio stations established in 1955
Radio stations disestablished in 1974
Portuguese-language radio stations
Mass media in Mindelo
Boa Vista, Cape Verde
Sal, Cape Verde
Santo Antão, Cape Verde
São Nicolau, Cape Verde
São Vicente, Cape Verde
1955 establishments in the Portuguese Empire
1974 disestablishments in the Portuguese Empire
Defunct mass media in Cape Verde